Muhammed Ali Fatih Erbakan (born January 1, 1979, Ankara) is a Turkish engineer and politician who is the founder and leader of the New Welfare Party (YRP). A son of Necmettin Erbakan, the former Prime Minister of Turkey who led the YRP's predecessor, the Welfare Party, he is the President of the Necmettin Erbakan Foundation.

Early life 
Fatih Erbakan was born on 1 January 1979 in Ankara, the capital city of Turkey. He completed his secondary education at an İmam Hatip institution and his high school education at Ankara Ayrancı High School. He graduated from Başkent University in the field of electrical engineering. He went to England to continue his higher education in pursuit of a Master's degree, but returned to Turkey when his mother, Nermin Erbakan, died. He later got his Master's degree from Başkent University. He completed his doctorate in management and organization at the same university.

Political career

Virtue Party and Felicity Party 
By 1999, Erbakan was a member of the Virtue Party. After its dissolution by the Constitutional Court of Turkey,  the Felicity Party was founded, which Erbakan joined. He was on the Board of the Headquarters Youth Branch, remaining in the party until the 5th Ordinary Congress in 2014.

New Welfare Party 
On November 23, 2018, he founded the New Welfare Party (YRP) again and was elected as its Chairman. The Welfare Party Again was organized in 81 provinces and 800 districts in Turkey and its work continues. As YRP Chairman on 17 November 2019, he organized one of the largest congresses in Turkish political history with the participation of 45,000 people. In addition, the first rally was held on February 9, 2020, in the area of Sakarya Democracy Square, as the Jerusalem Rally.

Personal life 
Erbakan is fluent in English. He is married and has two children.

References

External links
 Felicity Party website: Dr Fatih Erbakan 

1979 births
Felicity Party politicians
Living people
Turkish political party founders
Başkent University alumni
Children of national leaders